Kingfisher First Nation (Oji-Cree language: ᑮᐡᑭᒪᓂᐦᓰᐋᐧᐴᕽ (Giishkimanisiiwaaboong, "At Kingfisher-waters"); unpointed: ᑭᐡᑭᒪᓂᓯᐊᐧᐳᐠ) is an Oji-Cree First Nation reserve located  north of Sioux Lookout, Ontario, Canada. It is accessible by air all year and by waterway in summer and ice roads in winter. As of December 2009, the First Nation had a total registered population of 500 people, the on-reserve population being 462. The community speaks the Oji-Cree language, but most of it is fluent in English as well.

The police that serve Kingfisher Lake are the Nishnawbe-Aski Police Service, an Aboriginal-based service.

History
In 1808 the Hudson's Bay Company established an outpost at Big Beaver House, located approximately 12 kilometres southwest of the present Kingfisher Lake reserve. Big Beaver House was frequented by Kingfisher Lake people for trading fur, community activity and freight hauling employment.

In 1929 to 1930, the leaders of Kingfisher Lake First Nation were required to gather at Big Trout Lake to participate in the signing of the adhesion to Treaty 9. As the result, Kingfisher Lake was considered a part of Big Trout Lake Band.

In 1947, Ontario enacted the Trapline Registration and Fee Program, which eventually forced the Kingfisher Lake people to outline their ancestral hunting areas into trapping boundaries and also to pay for the land use requirements.

In 1964, the leaders of Kingfisher Lake decided to establish permanent community and to move to the current location of the reserve lands. As Kingfisher Lake was already included in the Big Trout Lake Band and so had reserve status, the formality of gaining band status was achieved in 1975.

In 2011, many of the residents were temporarily housed in Ottawa because of forest fires in the surrounding area.

Governance 

The officials of Kingfisher First Nation are elected for a two-year term through the Custom Electoral System. Their council consists of Chief Lott Sainnawap, Deputy Chief Eddie Mamakwa and three Councillors: Amos Mamakwa, Esther Sakakeep, and Samuel Sturgeon.

The First Nation is part of the Shibogama First Nations Council, a Regional Chiefs Council, and the Nishnawbe Aski Nation, a Tribal Political Organization representing majority of the First Nations in northern Ontario.

Reserve 
The First Nation have reserved three tracts for their Indian reserve:
  Kingfisher Lake 1 Indian Reserve, which serves as their main Reserve, containing the community of Kingfisher Lake, Ontario.
  Kingfisher 2A Indian Reserve
  Kingfisher 3A Indian Reserve

References

External links 
AANDC profile
Profile from Chiefs of Ontario
2006 Canadian Census: Kingfisher Lake Indian Reserve 1

First Nations governments in Ontario
Nishnawbe Aski Nation
Road-inaccessible communities of Ontario